The Mongolian short-toed lark or Sykes's short-toed lark (Calandrella dukhunensis) is a species of lark in the family Alaudidae. It breeds in China and Mongolia and winters in southern Asia.

Taxonomy and systematics
The Mongolian short-toed lark was originally placed in the genus Alauda. It was then considered as a subspecies of the morphologically similar greater short-toed lark, but recent analyses of both mitochondrial and nuclear DNA showed that it was more closely related to Hume's short-toed lark. It was split in 2016 by the IOC, although not all other authorities have recognized this re-classification to date. Additionally, some authorities considered the Mongolian short-toed lark to be a subspecies of the red-capped lark. The name 'Mongolian short-toed lark' is also used as an alternate name for the Asian short-toed lark. The alternate name short-toed lark may also be used for three other species in the genus Calandrella.

Description
The Mongolian short-toed lark is darker and has a shorter bill than the greater short-toed lark. The Mongolian short-toed lark breeds on the Tibetan plateau and winters mainly in peninsular India.

References

Mongolian short-toed lark
Birds of Mongolia
Birds of China
Mongolian short-toed lark